Keith R. Jerome is an American virologist whose research focuses on viruses such as herpes simplex, HIV and hepatitis B that persist in their hosts. He published on the first known case of COVID-19 in the United States detecting SARS-CoV-2 in Washington State and helped forge the nation's COVID-19 testing. In 2021, Jerome and Alexander Greninger shared the Washington Innovator of the Year award for developing the laboratory based assay for detecting COVID-19. He was senior author on a research article published in Science describing the cryptic transmission of SARS-CoV-2 alongside Trevor Bedford, Alexander Greninger, Jay Shendure, and Helen Chu. Regarding the origin of SARS-CoV-2 he reported that the live market in Wuhan was more likely than a lab leak of the virus.

Jerome studies the ways in which these viruses evade the immune system and potential therapies for these infections. Jerome and his colleagues study the uses of precision gene-editing tools like CRISPR/Cas9 to remove damaging viral genes that have tucked themselves into a person's genetic code or to insert genes that can protect cells from invading viruses. He has been working for years on research aimed at a cure for Herpes virus by using the DNA-cutting tools of gene therapy. Initial research showed these techniques could knock out small quantities of latent virus. He and his colleagues are exploring this approach in combination with blood stem cell transplants as a means of curing HIV.

Academic and medical appointments 

 Full professor, Fred Hutchinson Cancer Research Center, 2015–present
 Head, Virology Division, Laboratory Medicine, University of Washington, 2012–present
 Professor, Department of Laboratory Medicine and Pathology, University of Washington, 2012–present

Education and training 

 Senior Fellow, Virology Division, Department of Laboratory Medicine, University of Washington, 1997-1998
 Resident Physician, Department of Laboratory Medicine, University of Washington, 1995-1997
 Resident Physician, Department of Pathology, University of Washington, 1993-1995
 Duke University, MD, May 1993
 Duke University, PhD, Microbiology and Immunology, 1992
 Georgetown College, B.S., Chemistry, summa cum laude, 1985

Selected publications 
 https://www.nejm.org/doi/full/10.1056/NEJMoa2004500
 https://journals.asm.org/doi/full/10.1128/JCM.00557-20
 https://aacrjournals.org/cancerres/article/51/11/2908/496455/Cytotoxic-T-Lymphocytes-Derived-from-Patients-with
 https://www.nejm.org/doi/full/10.1056/NEJMc2026172
 https://journals.asm.org/doi/full/10.1128/JVI.73.11.8950-8957.1999
 https://journals.asm.org/doi/full/10.1128/JCM.02880-20
 https://www.science.org/doi/full/10.1126/science.abc0523

References 

Year of birth missing (living people)
Living people
American virologists
University of Washington faculty
Duke University alumni